Eulogius (born Vasily Semyonovich Georgiyevsky, ; April 10, 1868 – April 8, 1946 in Paris) was an Orthodox Christian bishop, who led elements of the Russian Orthodox diaspora in Western Europe from 1921 until his death. From 1931 he was head of the Patriarchal Exarchate for Orthodox Parishes of Russian Tradition in Western Europe. He was at various times archbishop and metropolitan bishop of the Moscow Patriarchate, the Russian Orthodox Church Outside Russia and the Ecumenical Patriarchate.

He served as metropolitan for two of the most influential Orthodox theologians of the twentieth century, Georges Florovsky and Sergius Bulgakov, which included serving as a mediator between them at several points.

Biography

Vasili Semyonovitch Georgiyevskiy was born on 10 April 1868.  He graduated from the Moscow Theological Academy in 1892.

In 1903 he was consecrated as a bishop of the Orthodox Church.

In 1907 he was a member of the Russian Duma.

From 1912 to 1914 he was bishop of Kholm with the title of archbishop, and from 1914 to 1919 he was archbishop of Volhynia.

After the Russian Revolution of 1917 Russian Orthodox Christians based outside Russia or who fled there from the communist regime found themselves in a difficult situation; and in 1921 Eulogius was appointed by Saint Tikhon, Patriarch of Moscow to head the ‘Provisional administration of the Russian parishes in Western Europe’.

During the early 1920s the majority of Russian Orthodox abroad, united by their opposition to the Soviet government, were members of the Russian Orthodox Church Outside Russia (ROCOR), in whose synod Eulogius sat. In 1927 Eulogius broke with the ROCOR (along with Metropolitan Platon (Rozhdestvensky) of New York, leader of the Russian Metropolia in America) and was subsequently condemned by them, splitting the Russian émigré community in western Europe.

In 1928 Metropolitan Sergius (Stragorodsky), then locum tenens of the Patriarchate of Moscow, demanded declarations of loyalty to the Soviet regime, a proposition which Eulogius initially supported but subsequently repudiated. In 1930, after taking part in a prayer service in London in supplication for Christians suffering under the Soviets, Eulogius was removed from office by Sergius and replaced.
Most of Eulogius' parishes remained loyal to him, however, as they were generally against the Soviet government. Eulogius then petitioned Patriarch Photios II of Constantinople to be received under his canonical care by virtue of the canons of the Council of Chalcedon. He and his community were received in 1931, becoming an exarchate of the Ecumenical Patriarchate.

In 1945, shortly before his death, Eulogius led the exarchate in a return to the Moscow patriarchate. After Eulogius's death (8 April 1946), Metropolitan Seraphim (Lukyanov) of Western Europe was appointed the new exarch by the Moscow Patriarchate. A large number of parishes, opposed to Seraphim, once again entered the Patriarchate of Constantinople, forming the basis of the exarchate which continued to 2018.

References

External links 

 
 OrthodoxWiki Eulogius (Georgievsky) of Paris

1868 births
1946 deaths
People from Odoyevsky District
People from Tula Governorate
Archbishops of Orthodox parishes of Russian tradition in Western Europe
Members of the 2nd State Duma of the Russian Empire
Members of the 3rd State Duma of the Russian Empire